Zamboanguita, officially the Municipality of Zamboanguita,  is a 4th class municipality in the province of Negros Oriental, Philippines. According to the 2020 census, it has a population of 29,569 people.

Zamboanguita was established in 1866. Modest compared to the 6th largest city in the Philippines with 98 barangays, Zamboanguita has only 10 barangays.

Etymology
A town rooted in history and replete with natural resources, Zamboanguita derived its name from an incident involving a coguita (octopus).  Long before the Spaniards set foot in Negros Island, fishermen from as far as Mindanao would visit the yet unnamed town and benefit from the bounty of its rich fishing grounds – from its small tugnos  (juvenile gobies) to the large iho (shark) in nearby Apo Island.

One day, a group of Moro fishermen fishing in the area found a coguita caught in their fishing net, which they then separated from their fish catch as it had tentacles and had no gills.  The leader of the Moro group then ordered one of his men to go to the beach, find a tree and “isab-ong ang coguita”  (hang the octopus).”  Since then,  every time an octopus was caught, it was hung on that particular tree.

The local people eventually started calling the place “Sab-ongan ug coguita.”  When the Spaniards descended on the town, they called the town “Zamboangaguita” and later on it was shortened to “Zamboanguita”.

On the other hand, local stories that circulated among the town folks mentioned that Zamboanguita, with its Spanish diminutive of -ita, (meaning "little Zamboanga") acquired its name from its neighbor down south across the sea, Zamboanga City.

Geography

 from Dumaguete, Zamboanguita is at the southern tip of the province of Negros Oriental and across from the island province of Siquijor. To the west of Zamboanguita is the municipality of Siaton, and to the north/east is the municipality of Dauin.

Barangays
Zamboanguita is politically subdivided into 10 barangays.

 Basak
 Calango
 Lutoban
 Malongcay Diot
 Maluay
 Mayabon
 Nabago
 Nasig-id
 Najandig
 Poblacion

Climate

Demographics

Economy

Tourism

 Fiesta: San Isidro Labrador, May 15

Government
It is part of the 3rd District of Negros Oriental.

Current elected officials of Zamboanguita (2022):
 Mayor: Jonah Pat L. Aviles
 Vice Mayor: Felipe Tuban Elmido Sr.
 Councilors:
 ELMIDO, JUNIOR
 TAAN, RICKY
 PARTOSA, HELEN
 PINILI, MARIO
 TRINIDAD, FLOR
 TRINIDAD, REINERIA
 BANUA, KIKING
 DELMO, CLINT CHARLES

Education

High schools
Gregorio Elmaga Memorial High School
Decor Carmeli Academy
Jose Marie Locsin Memorial High School
Kaladias High School
Santiago Delmo Memorial High School
Zamboanguita Science High School

Elementary schools

Zamboanguita Central Elementary School
Basak Elementary School
Benito Gadiana Elementary School
Calango Elementary School
Felix M. Tio Memorial Elementary School
Gregorio Elmaga Memorial Elementary School
Kaladias Elementary School
Lutoban Elementary School
Malongcay Elementary School
Maluay Elementary School
Nabago Elementary School
Salngan Elementary School

See also
 List of places named after places in the Philippines

References

External links

 [ Philippine Standard Geographic Code]
Philippine Census Information

Municipalities of Negros Oriental